Anders Magnusson (born 18 December 1968) is a Swedish wrestler. He competed in the men's Greco-Roman 68 kg at the 1996 Summer Olympics.

References

1968 births
Living people
Swedish male sport wrestlers
Olympic wrestlers of Sweden
Wrestlers at the 1996 Summer Olympics
Sportspeople from Stockholm